Sexual bullying is a type of bullying and harassment that occurs in connection with a person's sex, body,  sexual orientation or with sexual activity. It can be physical, verbal, and/or emotional.

Definition
The NSPCC has defined sexual bullying as "any bullying behaviour, whether physical or non-physical, that is based on a person's sexuality or gender. It is when sexuality or gender is used as a weapon by boys or girls towards other boys or girls – although it is more commonly directed at girls. It can be carried out to a person's face, behind their back or through the use of technology." The erstwhile Beatbullying organisation (now defunct) had a similar definition. It can be the use of sexual words to put someone down, like calling someone a slut, a slag, or gay, or spreading rumours about someone's alleged sex life. In its most extreme form, it can be inappropriate touching, sexual assault, or even rape. This term is primarily used in the United Kingdom and is not yet used in other areas.
Definitions and descriptions of bullying and of sexual bullying can be problematic, however. Offensive terms are often deployed in a friendly way, so the context of such exchanges is very important, and adults sometimes misinterpret them. Conversely, while much sexual bullying is overt, a great deal is not, and appears to be ordinary bullying. An example of this is the teasing by tough boys of a 'geeky' boy for his academic ability. What is actually happening is that the boy is being mocked for his lack of machismo, or his lack of engagement in heterosexist banter with girls or boys. Superficially, the bullying has no sexual content, but is underpinned by the aggressors staking a claim to dominance for their 'type of boy' (See Mac An Ghaill, 1994 and Duncan, 1999).

Prevalence
As part of its research into sexual bullying in schools, the BBC Panorama programme commissioned a
questionnaire aimed at young people aged 11–19 years in schools and youth clubs across five regions of England. The survey revealed that of the 273 young people who responded to the questionnaire, 28 had been forced to do something sexual and 31 had seen it happen to someone else. Of the 273 respondents, 40 had experienced unwanted touching. UK Government figures show that in school year 2007/8 there were 3,450 fixed period exclusions and 120 permanent exclusions from schools in England due to sexual misconduct. That equates to 19 exclusions per school day for incidents including groping and using sexually insulting language. From April 2008 to March 2009, ChildLine counselled a total of 156,729 children. Of these, 26,134 children spoke about bullying as a main concern and 300 of these talked specifically about sexual bullying. 25% of children who have attended Kidscape free ZAP anti-bullying sessions have reported some form of sexual bullying.

A significant proportion of LGBT students experience homophobic and transphobic violence in school. This is shown consistently by data from Africa, Asia, Europe, Latin America and the Caribbean, North America and the Pacific, with the proportion affected ranging from 16% in Nepal to 85% in the United States. LGBT students are also more likely to experience such violence at school than at home or in the community.

LGBT students report a higher prevalence of violence at school than their non-LGBT peers. In New Zealand, for example, lesbian, gay and bisexual students were three times more likely to be bullied than their heterosexual peers and in Norway 15–48% of lesbian, gay and bisexual students reported being bullied compared with 7% of heterosexual students.

Types of interactions
A survey by the UK National Union of Teachers suggests that sexual bullying is most often carried out by boys against girls, although girls are increasingly harassing girls and boys in a sexual manner. Research shows that sexual bullying starts at primary school level and usually  takes the form of verbal insults by boys directed at girls and women through demeaning sexually abusive and aggressive language. A NUT study shows that these verbal insults are generally centred on girls' sexual status including terms such as 'bitch', 'slag', 'tart' and 'slut'. Other researchers cite similar evidence. These incidents are typically dismissed as playful behaviour or justified through humour, however. The research also shows that boys are also subjected to a range of sexual bullying by other boys and by girls although this is said to be less obvious. The most prevalent issue is sexual verbal abuse and being called obscene names. The names that cause most offence to boys are homophobic terms and those that are associated with the 'absence' of high status masculinity. Sexual bullying can involve spreading rumours about someone's sexuality or sex life, or showing or posting sexual comments, photos, or videos, such as revenge porn.

Some people, including the UK charity Beatbullying, have claimed that children are being bullied into providing 'sexual favours' in exchange for protection as gang culture enters inner city schools. Other anti-bullying groups and teachers' unions, including the National Union of Teachers, challenged the charity to provide evidence of this, as they had no evidence that this sort of behaviour was happening in schools.

Associated effects and risks
Bullying victimization occurs more frequently in sexual minorities than heterosexual individuals. Sexual orientation-related physical bullying significantly correlates with mental distress and symptoms of trauma. When bullying co-occurs with adverse childhood experiences (see: Adverse Childhood Experiences Study), greater lifetime health disparities and health risk behaviours appear. Bullying, especially in adolescents, can lead to depression and suicidal ideation. Bullied sexual minority females are more likely to experience depression and suicidal ideation than their sexual minority male and heterosexual counterparts.

Anti-gay physical bullying, along with sexual abuse and verbal bullying, can lead to psychosocial health problems, which can be a predictor of risky sex behaviours. Men who have sex with men in the United States and Canada have a higher prevalence of HIV than any other cohort.

See also

Sources

References

Further reading
 Azam S Oral Sex Is the New Goodnight Kiss: The Sexual Bullying of Girls (2009)
 Duncan N Sexual Bullying: Gender Conflict and Pupil Culture in Secondary Schools (2001)
 Mac An Ghaill M The Making of Men: Masculinities, Sexualities and Schooling (1994)
 Rivers I and Duncan N Bullying: Experiences and Discourses of Sexuality and Gender (2013)
 Nobullying.com is an online forum aimed at educating, advising, counselling and all importantly, helping to stop bullying, in particular, cyber bullying

Bullying
Persecution
Sexual abuse
Abuse
Bullying